Halocyan Records is an American independent record label founded in 2010 by Dimitri Fergadis, the founder of experimental techno label Phthalo Records. Based in Los Angeles, California,  the label has released music by  DJ Pierre of Chicago-based acid house group Phuture, Paul Woolford, techno pioneer Joey Beltram, Vladislav Delay (as Sistol), ASC, xxxy, Appleblim & Al Tourettes, Extrawelt.

Halocyan promotes and releases music influenced by classic techno and house. Fergadis defines the label's goal as returning to techno's founding principle of "focusing on technology as an aesthetic question rather than as a background assumption for music."

Releases from the label have been met with critical acclaim, with Resident Advisor praising Sistol’s early Halocyan release for continuing to "pay out new and surprising dividends with each successive listen". Ibiza Voice praised the label for being "one of the most freethinking and consistent techno labels on the US West Coast".

In 2012 Halocyan took part in a Boiler Room label showcase, enlisting Chrissy Murderbot, John Tejada, DJ Pierre, Dntel, Exillon and Sumsun to perform.

In October 2014 the label released Universal Quantifier, a double-CD label compilation of original tracks and remixes. It was critically acclaimed by a number of titles, including self-titled "A body of work that distinguishes Halocyan as a truly remarkable purveyor of forward dance styles", DJ Mag "A tasty portfolio", Impose Magazine "A shining example of the trance-inducing, future-leaning club the label’s been steadily curating" and Textura "A collective snapshot of experimental club music in its current form".

Artists

Remixers

Discography

References

American independent record labels
Detroit techno